Louis-Esprit d'Aymar was a French Navy officer. He fought in the Indian Ocean under Suffren during the War of American Independence, captaining the 64-gun Saint Michel at the Battle of Trincomalee from 25 August to 3 September 1782,  and the 74-gun Annibal at the Battle of Cuddalore on 20 June 1783.

Biography 
The Chevalier d'Aymar was born to the family of a treasurer from Aix-en-Provence. He joined the Navy as a Garde-Marine on 29 September 1749. He was promoted to Lieutenant on 1 May 1763, and to Captain on 4 April 1777.

Aymar took part in the Battle of Martinique, on 17 April 1780, at the command of Saint-Michel. Along with Vengeur and Destin, Saint Michel directly engaged the much stronger Sandwich, under Rodney, Cornwall and Suffolk. Being smallest of the ship, Saint-Michel sustained especially heavy damage, and Aymar had his right arm was shot away by a cannonball.

Aymar left France in November 1781 at the command of Saint-Michel, part of a division also comprising the 74-gun Illustre the frigate Consolante. The division made in junction with Suffren's squadron at Batacalo on 9 August 1782.

Aymar captained the 64-gun Saint Michel at the Battle of Trincomalee from 25 August to 3 September 1782.  When Suffren reshuffled his captains after the Battle of Trincomalee, he promoted d'Aymar to the 74-gun Annibal. D'Aymar commanded her at the Battle of Cuddalore on 20 June 1783.

After the war, he was amongst the captains that Suffren recommended for promotion  He received a 600-livre pension in recognition of his service.

In 1791, after the duel between Lameth and Castries, Aymar publicly regretted that Castries had not killed Lameth. A crowd then brutalised Aymar.

D'Aymar was promoted to Rear Admiral on 1 January 1792.

Sources and references 
 Notes

References

 Bibliography
 
 

French Navy officers